Betapsestis brevis is a moth in the family Drepanidae. It was described by John Henry Leech in 1900. It is found in the Chinese provinces of Shaanxi, Gansu and Sichuan.

References

Moths described in 1911
Thyatirinae
Moths of Asia